Jonathan Charles (born 9 July 1964 in Nottingham) is a former news presenter for BBC World News and Director of the Communications department at the European Bank for Reconstruction and Development (EBRD).

Education and personal life
Charles has an MA in Politics, Philosophy and Economics from Oriel College, Oxford University, and is fluent in French and German.

He is a self-confessed supporter of Nottingham Forest.

Career

Journalism
Charles is a former news anchor on BBC World News programmes, BBC World News. His specialist areas include economics, the EU and international diplomacy; he has a keen interest in issues surrounding the single currency.

Whilst working at BBC World News, he was perhaps most infamous for an apparent lack of punctuation during a rehearsal before the hourly news bulletin, leading to him transitioning immediately and without pause from the introduction to the first story, resulting in an accidental suggestion that he had been “kept hidden for almost two decades and forced to bear children”.

Communications
Between 2011 and 2022 Charles was the Director of the Communications department at the European Bank for Reconstruction and Development (EBRD) and a member of the Bank's weekly Executive Committee (EXCOM).

Consultancy 
Since July 2022, Charles has been advising some Central Asian governments on media development within their nations as well as recording and producing the Vinyl Countdown Podcast with his son, Max.

References

External links
Jonathan Charles Twitter

BBC World News
BBC newsreaders and journalists
People from Nottingham
1964 births
Living people
British male journalists
Journalists from London